WPOC (93.1 FM) is a commercial radio station in Baltimore, Maryland.  It airs a country music radio format and is owned by iHeartMedia, Inc.  The studios and offices are at The Rotunda Shopping Center, on West 40th Street, in Baltimore.

The transmitter, with an effective radiated power (ERP) of 16,000 watts, is off North Rolling Road in Catonsville, Maryland. It has a height above average terrain (HAAT) of 264 meters (886 feet), providing WPOC with a wide coverage area from Washington, D.C. to the Maryland-Pennsylvania state line, and from Annapolis to Frederick. It broadcasts using HD Radio technology. Its HD2 digital subchannel formerly carried "24/7 Comedy Legends", a comedy format.

History
On February 4, 1960, the station signed on as WFMM-FM.  It was owned by the Commercial Radio Institute (which eventually evolved into Sinclair Broadcast Group) with studios on West Biddle Street. It was a rare stand-alone FM station, not associated with an AM station or a newspaper.

In 1974, the station was acquired by Nationwide Communications, a division of Nationwide Insurance.  Nationwide decided to put a country music format on 93.1.  The call sign was switched from WFMM-FM to WPOC, standing for Pride Of the Chesapeake, because the station covers much of Chesapeake Bay.  The station affiliated with the ABC Directions Network for national news.

In 1999, the station was acquired by Clear Channel Communications, which maintained the country music format.  Clear Channel later became iHeartMedia, the current owner.

Airstaff and Honors
WPOC has been voted "Baltimore's Best Country Station" several times, along with other industry awards. The station is home to "The Laurie DeYoung Morning Show." She is joined by Claire Scattergood, newscaster and producer Jeff St. Pierre, and traffic reporter Mark Williams. DeYoung was inducted into the Country Music DJ Hall of Fame in 2010.

Midday is hosted by Bob Delmont, while Michael J. hosts the afternoon drive time. Premiere Networks' syndicated "The Bobby Bones Show" is carried in the evening and Cody Allen's syndicated show is heard overnight. Saturday evenings feature the "Country House Party."

Past Personalities 

 Marty Bass
 Bill Rehkof (Later at KDKA Pittsburgh) 
 Bill Vanko (Later at WBAL) 
 Mary Street-early news director
 Pat Nason
 Mike Fast
 Lee Dennis
 Gail Svenson
 Ted Patterson
 Fran Severn
 Jen Phoenix
 Justin Cole
 Diane Lynn
 Trish Hennessey
 Libby Cole
 Jeff Michaels
 Tom Conroy
 Bob Raleigh (formerly WPGC)
 Todd Grimsted
 Scott Lawrence
 Danny Reese
 Brenda Bissett
 Greg Cole
 Jim Conway
 Ken Boesen-pd
 Scott Lindy-pd
 Doug Wilson-pd
 Bob Moody-pd
 Larry Clark-pd
 Tony Girard
 Mark Joseph

References

External links
WPOC Official Website

1974 establishments in Maryland
POC
Nationwide Communications
Radio stations established in 1974
POC
IHeartMedia radio stations